Francis Yi Ku (December 29, 1931 July 16, 2005) was a Korean prince who was head of the House of Yi from 1970 until 2005. He was a grandson of Emperor Gojong of the Joseon dynasty. Through Kuni Asahiko, Ku was a second-cousin to Emperor Emeritus Akihito of Japan.

Early life
Ku was born in Kitashirakawa Palace (which is currently the Akasaka Prince Classic House, formerly part of the Akasaka Prince Hotel), Kioicho, Kojimachiku, Tokyo, Japan; his parents were Crown Prince Yi Un of Korea and Yi Bangja. Ku attended the Gakushuin Peers' School in Tokyo. He later attended Centre College, Danville, Kentucky and studied architecture at Massachusetts Institute of Technology both in the U.S.

Adult life
He was employed as an architect with I.M. Pei & Assocs, Manhattan, New York from 1959 to 1964. Made stateless by Japan in 1947, Ku acquired United States citizenship in 1959 and Korean citizenship in 1964. He married Julia Mullock (b. 1927) on 25 October 1959 at St George's Church in New York and they adopted a daughter, Eugenia Unsuk.

After the fall of Syngman Rhee, he returned to Korea in 1963 with the help of the new president Park Chung-hee, moving into the New Building of Nakseonjae hall, Changdeok Palace with his mother and wife. He lectured on architecture at Seoul National University and Yonsei University and also managed his own airline, Shinhan. When that went bankrupt in 1979, he went to Japan to earn money. In 1982, his family forced him to divorce his wife because she was sterile; his mother died in 1989. He started living with a Japanese astrologer, Mrs. Arita. In November 1996, he decided to reside permanently in Korea.

Death
Restlessly going back and forth between Japan and Korea, he eventually died of a heart attack, at the age of seventy-five, on July 16, 2005 at the Akasaka Prince Hotel, the former residence of his parents in Tokyo, Japan. His funeral was held on July 24, 2005 and his posthumous title decided as "Prince Imperial Hoeun" by the Jeonju Lee Royal Family Association. He is buried at the Hoeinwon Royal Tomb near his father and mother.

Yi Ku didn't have an heir. According to the Jeonju Lee Royal Family Association, Yi Won, Yi Ku's first cousin once removed, was appointed as the heir by him. Yi Ku already considered adopting an heir for the imperial line of succession and Yi Won was considered; after meeting Yi Won several times, he was satisfied about the foreign language abilities of his cousin and allowed Won to be his successor. As of July 10, 2005, less than a week before his death, Yi Ku met the chairman of the association, Lee Hwan-ey (이환의, 李桓儀), for the last time, and Yi Ku formerly signed to adopt Yi Won as his heir. Despite that Yi Ku died soon afterwards, the Jeonju Lee Royal Family Association held a meeting for the adoption legitimacy in July 21, and in the next day, July 22, 2005, Yi Won was officially recognized by the association to be the successor of late Yi Ku.

References

External links 
 Korean royalty
 Death announcement in Korea Times
 Farewell to royal heir evokes memories of Korea's past
 obituary in the English edition of Dong-A Ilbo

1929 births
2005 deaths
Centre College alumni
MIT School of Architecture and Planning alumni
House of Yi
American architects
Japanese emigrants to the United States
American people of Korean descent
South Korean people of Japanese descent
South Korean Roman Catholics
Pretenders to the Korean throne
Zainichi Korean people
People from Tokyo
Korean anti-communists